A market requirements document (MRD) in project management and systems engineering, is a document that expresses the customer's wants and needs for the product or service.
It is typically written as a part of product marketing or product management. The document should explain:
 What (new) product is being discussed
 Who the target customers are
 What products are in competition with the proposed one
 Why customers are likely to want this product.

See also 
 Product requirements document
 Requirements management
 User requirements document

References

Product management